Dziani Dzaha, or Lake Dziani, is a crater lake on the island of Petite Terre in the French overseas territory of Mayotte. It is well known for its underwater lava tube caves and their fabled hidden pirate treasure. Whilst diving these caves is forbidden by law there is a growing cottage industry of guides that take intrepid tourists into its murky depths for the chance to score some pirate treasure.

References

Volcanic crater lakes
Bodies of water of Mayotte